Bob Herbert (11 March 1919 – 16 January 2004) was  a former Australian rules footballer who played with Hawthorn and Melbourne in the Victorian Football League (VFL).

Notes

External links 

1919 births
2004 deaths
Australian rules footballers from Victoria (Australia)
Hawthorn Football Club players
Melbourne Football Club players